Aristotle is a 2003 English-language children's book written by Dick King-Smith and illustrated by Bob Graham, published in 2003. The story concerns Aristotle the kitten, who depends on his nine lives and the magical powers of his owner (a friendly witch) in order to emerge safely from various adventures. Shortly after it was recommended to them by Joe Harper, it was shortlisted for a Blue Peter Book Award.

References

2003 British novels
Fictional cats
British children's novels
Children's novels about animals
2003 children's books
Books about cats
British children's books
Walker Books books